Isle-aux-Grues (French for "island of cranes") is an island situated on the Saint Lawrence River, in the municipality of Saint-Antoine-de-l'Isle-aux-Grues, in the Montmagny Regional County Municipality (MRC), in administrative region of Chaudière-Appalaches, in Quebec, in Canada.

Geography
The Isle-aux-Grues is measuring about 7 kilometres long and 2 kilometres wide. It is one of the twenty-one islands which make up the Isle-aux-Grues archipelago.

Transportation
The island has an airstrip which is the only access to the island during the winter. Isle-aux-Grues is also served by a ferry during the summer.

Education
Children from Isle-aux-Grues attend school in Montmagny, Quebec, travelling by plane each day.

Person connected to the island
 The Québecois painter Jean-Paul Riopelle died on the island on 12 March 2002.

May 2010 plane crash
On May 19, 2010 at about 3:30 p.m. Eastern time, a Cessna 172 airplane carrying four people crashed on Isle-aux-Grues, killing three people initially. The fourth later died in hospital.

Toponymy 
The toponym "Île aux Grues" was made official on December 5, 1968 at the Commission de toponymie du Québec.

References

External links
 Tourism website

Landforms of Chaudière-Appalaches
River islands of Quebec
Islands of the Saint Lawrence River
Canada geography articles needing translation from French Wikipedia